Lukas Mössner (born 14 March 1984 in Sankt Pölten) is an Austrian footballer currently playing for ASV Draßburg. He has also made 14 appearances for the Austria U-21 team, scoring three goals.

Honours
Pasching
Austrian Cup: 2012–13

References

External links
 

1984 births
Living people
Austrian footballers
People from Sankt Pölten
FC Juniors OÖ players
TSV Hartberg players
SV Mattersburg players
SK Austria Kärnten players
FK Austria Wien players
SKN St. Pölten players
SV Eintracht Trier 05 players
Association football forwards
Footballers from Lower Austria